Home and Away is an Australian television soap opera. It was first broadcast on the Seven Network on 17 January 1988. The following is a list of characters that first appeared in Home and Away in 1991, by order of first appearance. They were all introduced by the show's executive producer Des Monaghan. The 4th season of Home and Away began airing on the Seven Network on 7 January 1991. The first introduction of the year was Josh Webb in February. Bruce Roberts began appearing as Nick Parrish in March. The following month, Ryan Clark made his debut as Sam Nicholls as did Naomi Watts as Revhead's sister Julie Gibson. Dee Smart began playing Lucinda Croft in June. Her brother David, played by Guy Pearce appeared from July. Alistair MacDougall arrived as Ryan Lee in August. In September, Tina Thomsen, Ross Newton, and Richard Norton joined the cast as Finlay Roberts, Greg Marshall and Simon Fitzgerald, respectively. Finlay's mother, Irene Roberts made her debut in October, followed by her son Damian, played by Matt Doran in November.

Josh Webb

Josh Webb, played by Erik Mitsak, debuted on-screen during the episode broadcast 7 February 1991 and departed on 7 January 1992. In The Official Home and Away Annual John Kercher said that the character is "about as bad as they come". But Josh is "fortunate to have the type of angelic looks that make people forgive him". He has a backstory featuring a life of crime - stealing vehicles and making money by any means possible. Josh is a "rapid talker and very street wise" which meant that he could always outsmart the law. Josh had always used his mother Gerry (Julie Godfrey) because he knew how to "wrap her around his little finger". He loves her but creates a pretence for her and "frequently lies" to get what he wants. She does not want him to leave her, so she believes anything that he says. But this leaves Josh free to take advantage of the predicament.

Josh is Rachel Webb's (Beth Champion) older brother. He befriends her boyfriend Blake Dean (Les Hill) and invites him, his sister Karen (Belinda Jarrett) and their friends Haydn Ross (Andrew Hill) and Sophie Simpson (Rebekah Elmaloglou) to a party at his place. The party turns into a drugs bust when Sgt. Chris Hale (John Meillon Jr.) arrives. When Josh learns of Blake and Rachel's romance, he hits Blake. 
Adam Cameron (Mat Stevenson) acts as a decoy to date Rachel but Josh sees through this plan and attacks Blake at the Bayside diner the next day, prompting Adam to intervene and punch Josh. As a measure of revenge, Josh frames Adam for the theft of Summer Bay High's raffle money. However, he is later exposed as the real culprit and jailed.

After being released, Josh puts on an act of having changed his ways and invites Blake and Adam on a camping trip but little do they know he is planning to kill them both. Blake and Adam quickly realise what Josh is up to and foil his murder attempt and he is arrested and sent back to prison.

Nick Parrish

Nick Parrish, played by Bruce Roberts debuted on screen during the episode airing on 4 March 1991. Roberts received the role of Nick a day after he left drama school. He quit the serial in 1994 to relocate to the UK to be with his girlfriend, Suzanne Dando. An unstamped fan letter for Roberts from a woman in the United Kingdom named "Kate" 
was delivered to the Network Seven studios. Roberts said that he received plenty of fan mail from the UK, but he had never had one like Kate's letter. The letter simply read "Dear Nick, We will be married next week, Kate."

Sam Marshall

Sam Marshall, played by Ryan Clark debuted on screen during the episode airing on 3 April 1991.  Clark was seven years old when he secured the role of Sam in 1991. He was only allowed to film Home and Away for three days a week, so he could attend school during the remaining days. Clark was provided with a tutor on set so he could keep up with his schoolwork. He left the serial in 2000 in order to pursue another career path. Clark reprised the role in 2005 alongside several past cast members to celebrate the serial's 4000th episode. Glenn Wheeler of The Morning Show opined that Sam formed a part of one of Australian television's "much loved families" for a decade. Sam was popular with the teenage female demographic, who would tune into the show daily to watch the character. MSN online's columnist opined that Clark played "one of Australia's very own '90s teen heartthrobs"

Julie Gibson

Julie Gibson, played by Naomi Watts 
made her first appearance on 23 April 1991 and departed on 30 May 1991.

Julie's storyline involves her beginning a relationship with Nick Parrish (Bruce Roberts). However, when her brother Revhead (Gavin Harrison) learns of their romance he is not happy. As Tom Etherington from TV Week reported, Revhead "didn't do anything by the book" and "his head nearly exploded" because Nick is a police officer. He "tried his best" to separate the pair but they separated end the relationship on their own terms.  Etherington added that "it became obvious they were better suited to being just good friends". Watts later described the experience as "six miserable weeks".

Julie is in a wheelchair owing to a car accident that left her paralysed when she was younger. She dates Nick which annoys Revhead, who is overprotective of Julie and schemes to split them up. Following her father, Alec's (David Baldwyn) death of a heart attack, Julie is distraught when Nick splits up with her. She decides to leave the bay to attend university in the city which upsets Revhead, who feels Julie will struggle but assures him she can make it on her own and leaves.

Lucinda Croft

Lucinda "Lou" Croft, played by Dee Smart, debuted on screen on 13 June 1991 and departed in 1992. Smart had been studying drama in Sydney for three years when she secured the role of Lucinda. It was Smart's first ever acting role. and she signed a contract to remain with the series for two years. However, Smart quit after 8 months into her contract.  
Mary Fletcher of Inside Soap said that Smart helped make Lucinda one of Home and Away's most popular characters.

David Croft

David Croft, played by Guy Pearce, made his first on-screen appearance on 19 July 1991. Pearce began filming in May 1991 and David introduced as the nephew of Donald Fisher (Norman Coburn) and brother to Lucinda (Dee Smart). David made his last appearance on 21 August 1991.

Pearce's role with the serial lasted just six weeks. In The official Home and Away Annual John Kercher explained David arrives to see his "estranged" sister Lucinda because he wants to attempt to "patch things up" with her. But he soon finds a new reason to stay in the form of Sophie Simpson (Rebekah Elmaloglou). Pearce told Kercher that "it all starts by Sophie having a crush on me [David], she decides that i'm too old, but then we do get together and that's where the trouble starts..."

David arrives in Summer Bay to visit his uncle, Donald and meets his estranged sister Lucinda who is frosty with him due to a falling out they had when they were younger due to David's investment idea failing and resulting in their parents losing their home. Donald plays referee between the two siblings and they later reconcile. Sophie is attracted to David and he feels the same way about her. They begin a relationship but it is revealed and Donald and Sophie's foster parents Michael (Dennis Coard) and Pippa Ross (Debra Lawrence) express their disapproval with the relationship as David is much older than Sophie. Pippa then makes a deal with Sophie, If she still feels the same about David after two weeks away at Pippa's mother, Coral King's (Jessica Noad) house, She and Michael will leave the couple alone. David decides to leave on a trip of his own too but he and Sophie agree to meet up when they return. The couple part after Sophie gives David a taped message to play.

That night, David sets off in his car on Yabbie Creek road, listening to the tape. Karen Dean (Belinda Jarrett) and Adam Cameron (Mat Stevenson) arrive in an oncoming car and there is a head-on collision which David tries to avoid but he is killed instantly. When Sophie returns from Coral's, she is devastated to learn of David's death and is shocked to learn Karen is responsible. She is initially angry at Pippa and Michael for sending her away but calms down. Sophie then discovers she is pregnant with David's baby and later gives birth to a daughter, Tamara (Emily and Chloe Hutton). Sophie then moves to Perth near David's mother Mary (Jan Kingsbury). Sophie has another child in 2003 and names him after David.

Barbara Toner, a writer for the Sydney Morning Herald expressed her disappointment in David's storyline with Sophie. She opined: "Guy Pearce, fresh from his film career, has turned up as a nasty, but his storyline was even less fascinating than whatever is going on between hard man-on-the-run Revhead and personality girl Karen. Theirs could have been a goer but they seem to have underlined the wrong words on their scripts so I'm afraid I gave up on them."

Channel 5 chose the episode where David is killed in a car crash with Adam Cameron and Karen Dean as one of their "favourite ever Home and Away episodes".

Ryan Lee

Ryan Lee, portrayed by Alistair MacDougall, made his first on-screen appearance on 22 August 1991 and made his last appearance on 27 November 1992. After MacDougall's departure he told Josephine Monroe from Inside Soap that because he loved playing Ryan, he would go back for a cameo appearance as long as the scriptwriters made his character bad. and added "I would have stayed longer before if the scripts had been good enough." Another Inside Soap writer branded Ryan a "rich, ratbag".

Finlay Roberts

Finlay Roberts, played by Tina Thomsen, made her first appearance on 18 September 1991 and remained in the serial until 1994. Thomsen returned to guest star in 1996 and 1997.
Thomsen was still a teenager when she relocated from Brisbane to Sydney with her family after winning the role of Finlay. In an interview with Jenna Price of the Sydney Morning Herald, Thomsen described her parents as not pushy and said "It's me who did the pushing ... my parents just supported me."

Greg Marshall

Greg Marshall, portrayed by Ross Newton, made his first on-screen appearance on 20 September 1991. Newton departed the show in 1993, before making a brief return in 2000. Newton told Glenn Wheeler of The Morning Show that joining the cast of Home and Away "was a wonderful opportunity because it was in its early stages of being a success story as a show". Wheeler opined that Greg formed a part of one of Australian television's "much loved families".

Simon Fitzgerald

Simon Fitzgerald, portrayed by Richard Norton, made his first appearance during the episode airing on 25 September 1991 and departed on 24 July 1992. Norton had finished a year-long stint on rival soap opera Neighbours before joining Home and Away. Brendon Williams writing for the Daily Mirror said that Norton proved to be "a big hit" as Simon.

Irene Roberts

Irene Roberts made her first appearance on 29 October, played by Jacqui Phillips, Lynne McGranger later took the role. For McGranger's portrayal of Irene, she was nominated in the category 
of "Funniest Performance" at the 2007 Inside Soap Awards. The Sydney Morning Herald have referred to Irene as one of the serial's three "legacy characters", along with Alf and Colleen. Holy Soap recall Irene's most memorable moment as being: "Being attacked by the mad ex-wife of her former lover Ken."

Damian Roberts

Damian Roberts, played by Matt Doran, debuted on-screen during the episode airing on 6 November 1991. Doran became a regular in 1992 and remained in the serial until 1995. He continued to guest star until 1996. Ben Hamilton played a young Damian in flashbacks in 1997. On one of his returns, Jason Herbison from Inside Soap Damian had "thrown off his clean cut image" by having his hair in dreadlocks. A reporter from BIG! wrote that through playing Damian, Doran had become "one of the world's most popular soap stars" and gained many "girl fans" who "adored him". A columnist from Shout said that "poor old Damian" filled his on-screen time with a hobby of jogging but there was "no sign of a girlie". They said that the character need a relationship storyline, adding "when will Matt Doran finally get to have a major on-screen smooch, that's what were asking". A writer from Inside Soap  opined that the character "is always going to be a loser".

Others

References

External links
Characters and cast at the Official AU Home and Away website
Characters and cast at the Official UK Home and Away website
Characters and cast at the Internet Movie Database

, 1991
, Home and Away